Veronika Sluková (born 15 December 1998) is a Slovak footballer who plays as a midfielder and has appeared for the Slovakia women's national team.

Career
Sluková has been capped for the Slovakia national team, appearing for the team during the 2019 FIFA Women's World Cup qualifying cycle.

References

External links
 
 
 

1998 births
Living people
Slovak women's footballers
Slovakia women's international footballers
Women's association football midfielders
USC Landhaus Wien players
Expatriate women's footballers in Austria
Slovak expatriate sportspeople in Austria
ÖFB-Frauenliga players